Paralympic medal table may refer to:
 the All-time Paralympic Games medal table
 an explanation as to how medal tables are sorted during the Paralympic Games. If so, see the article "Olympic medal table", which also applies to the Paralympics.